Congress of the People may refer to:

 Congress of the People (1955), a political summit in South Africa
 Congress of the People (South African political party)
 Congress of the People (Trinidad and Tobago), a political party

See also
 Congress of People, a political party in India